Furia is a 1999 French romantic post-apocalyptic sci-fi film directed by Alexandre Aja, who co-wrote the screenplay with Grégory Levasseur, adapted from the science fiction short story "Graffiti" by Julio Cortázar. It stars Stanislas Merhar and Marion Cotillard.

Cast
Stanislas Merhar as  Théo 
Marion Cotillard as  Elia 
Wadeck Stanczak as  Laurence 
Pierre Vaneck as  Aaron 
Carlo Brandt as  Freddy 
Laura del Sol as  Olga 
Jean-Claude de Goros as  Tonio 
Étienne Chicot as  Quicailler
Yash Furia as Yash Furia

Soundtrack

References

External links

1999 films
1990s science fiction films
French science fiction films
1999 romantic drama films
French political films
Films directed by Alexandre Aja
French post-apocalyptic films
Films based on science fiction short stories
Films based on works by Julio Cortázar
1990s French-language films
1990s French films